Ro-Kyu-Bu! is a 12-episode anime television series based on the light novels of the same name. The series, produced by Project No.9 and Studio Blanc, aired in Japan between July 1 and September 24, 2011 on the AT-X network and was later rebroadcast on KBS Kyoto, Tokyo MX, TV Kanagawa, Sun TV, Chiba TV, TV Aichi, and Teletama. The series is directed by Keizou Kusakawa with Michiko Itō has script supervisor. Sentai Filmworks licensed the anime for simulcast, though were later requested by the production committee to relinquish home video rights. An original video animation titled Ro-Kyu-Bu!: Tomoka no Ichigo Sundae was bundled with the release of the PlayStation Portable game Ro-Kyu-Bu!: Himitsu no Otoshimono on June 20, 2013.

A second season titled Ro-Kyu-Bu! SS, produced by Project No.9 and directed by Tetsuya Yanagisawa, began airing on July 5, 2013. The opening theme is "Get goal!" and the ending theme is "Rolling! Rolling!"; both songs are sung by the five-member group Ro-Kyu-Bu!.

Episode list

Ro-Kyu-Bu! (2011)

Ro-Kyu-Bu! SS (2013)

References

Ro-Kyu-Bu!